Trichanthera is a genus of flowering plant in the family Acanthaceae, native to central and southern tropical America. The genus was first described by Carl Sigismund Kunth in 1845.

Species
, Plants of the World Online accepted the following species:
Trichanthera corymbosa Leonard
Trichanthera gigantea (Bonpl.) Nees

References

Acanthaceae
Acanthaceae genera